The Ohio River flood of 1937 took place in late January and February 1937. With damage stretching from Pittsburgh to Cairo, Illinois, 385 people died, one million people were left homeless and property losses reached $500 million ($10.2 billion when adjusted for inflation as of September 2022). Federal and state resources were strained to aid recovery as the disaster occurred during the depths of the Great Depression and a few years after the beginning of the Dust Bowl.

Event timeline
 January 5: Water levels began to rise.
 January 10–18: Numerous flood warnings were issued across much of the region.
 January 13–24: Near record rainfalls were recorded.
 January 18: Numerous homes were flooded as the Ohio River started to overflow its banks due to the heavy rains.
 January 26: River gauge levels reached  in Cincinnati, the highest level in the city's history.
 January 27: River gauge reached  in the Louisville area, setting a new record. Seventy percent of the city was under water at that time.
 February 2: River gauge surpassed  in Paducah, Kentucky.
 February 5: Water levels fell below the flood stage for the first time in nearly three weeks in several regions.

Aftermath and reconstruction

Media response
A handful of powerhouse radio stations, including WLW Cincinnati and WHAS Louisville, quickly switched to non-stop news coverage, transmitting commercial-free for weeks.  These broadcasts consisted mostly of messages being relayed to rescue crews, as many civil agencies had no other means of communication. The Regionalist painter Thomas Hart Benton was commissioned by The Kansas City Star and St. Louis Post-Dispatch newspapers to provide sketches depicting the miserable conditions of the flooded areas in the Missouri Bootheel region.

When it became obvious that the river would cut the electric power to radio station WHAS—thus cutting the last radio voice in Louisville—the rival clear channel station in Nashville, WSM, picked up WHAS's broadcast via telephone and broadcast emergency flood reports for three days for the lower Ohio River.  Other stations across the country did much the same.

Around January 18, Huntington, WV radio station WSAZ (1190 AM) began hourly broadcasts of flood related news. On January 22, the station received permission from the Federal Communications Committee to broadcast around the clock. 
The studios and offices in the downtown Keith-Albee Theatre Building became a regional communications center. They established direct telephonic communication with the city's general relief headquarters in City Hall with Red Cross, the Naval Reserve, the American Legion, the police and fire departments, and the Coast Guard. 
Messages of inquiry concerning the safety of friends and relatives, warnings of rising gasoline-covered waters, appeals for help from marooned victims, orders to relief agencies and workers poured into the cramped studios and quickly broadcast. 
Staff and local volunteers stayed on the air and provided information and support for nine days until 8:00 o'clock the following Sunday night, Jan. 31, when the station's regular schedule was resumed.

Government response
In January 1937, the U.S. Army Corps of Engineers, District Engineer, MAJ Bernard Smith dispatched an entire fleet down the Cumberland River for rescue and relief work in response to the severe flooding. The bridges were too low to allow the vessels to pass under, so the vessels were forced to steam across farmland and bridge approaches, dodging telephone and power lines.

The federal government under President Franklin D. Roosevelt sent thousands of area WPA workers to the affected cities to aid in rescue and recovery. It also sent supplies for food and temporary housing, and millions of dollars in aid after the floodwaters receded.

The scale of the 1937 flood was so unprecedented that civic and industrial groups lobbied national authorities to create a comprehensive plan for flood control. The plan involved creating more than seventy storage reservoirs to reduce Ohio River flood heights. Not fully completed by the Army Corps of Engineers until the early 1940s, the new facilities have drastically reduced flood damages since.

In the 1930s, the Tennessee Valley Authority sought to create a continuous minimum 9-foot (2.7 m) channel along the entirety of the Tennessee River from Paducah to Knoxville. The Authority also sought to help control flooding on the lower Mississippi River, especially in the aftermath of the Ohio River flood of 1937, as research had shown that 4% of the water in the lower Mississippi River originates in the Tennessee River watershed. TVA surveyed the lower part of the river and considered the Aurora Landing site, but eventually settled on the present site at river mile 22.4. The Kentucky Dam project was authorized on May 23, 1938, and construction began July 1, 1938.

Much of the work of the Tennessee Valley Authority in the Tennessee River basin was strongly supported by the majority of the citizens in western Kentucky and their representatives in the United States Congress. U.S. Sen. Alben W. Barkley of Paducah and U.S. Rep. William Gregory from Mayfield and his brother U.S. Rep. Noble Gregory from Mayfield who succeeded him in office strongly supported the funding of TVA and its role in addressing flood control, soil conservation, family relocation, recreation, production of electricity, and economic development.

States seriously affected

Ohio
January 1937 remains as the wettest month ever recorded in Cincinnati.

One hundred thousand people in Cincinnati were left homeless, as the flood affected the city from January 18 to February 5. Ohio River levels on January 26–27 were the highest known from Gallipolis downstream past Cincinnati. Among the flooded structures was Crosley Field, home field of the Cincinnati Reds baseball team. Additionally, the amusement park Coney Island was submerged, causing pieces of carousel horses to float away, which were recovered as far downriver as Paducah.

According the several local historians, the town of Gallipolis was completely submerged as high as the mound hill cemetery overlook, and many rumors regarding the curse of Lafayette's Gold Treasure buried by slaves on Gallipolis Island began to surface around the town.This flood was very severe.

The Ohio River eventually crested  over the top of the flood wall. Ten people died, many fewer than the 467 killed in the floods of March 1913.

Indiana

After January 19, the conditions in New Albany, Indiana were deteriorating at a rapid pace. By January 21, all roads leading to Jeffersonville were completely covered in water making it near impossible to travel. On January 23, a levee located on the intersection of two main streets failed. This caused for water to start rushing into the city; by midday, the water had risen to a total of 9 feet. The city and state declared martial law on January 24 and the federal government sent 4,000 WPA workers to the city to assist rescue operations. Residents were rapidly evacuated from river town by train and bus in the early stages of the flood, making Indiana the only state to avoid drowning fatalities. According to some residents of the area, the sound of the rushing water was equivalent to that of the Niagara Falls. More than 100,000 persons were left homeless by the disaster.

The WPA workers led the cleanup of the city. The Evansville Merchants Retail Bureau took out newspaper ads to praise their work:

Before and during the flood these men of WPA were active in salvaging property and saving lives, and immediately afterward they handled the cleanup job with such efficiency that many visitors were amazed that there was practically no evidence of the flood left throughout our entire city. All honor and gratitude is due to the rank and file of the WPA for their often almost super-human efforts, always giving their best in the interest of humanity.

The Red Cross and federal government spent the equivalent of $11 million in today's money in aid to the city. The Indiana State Flood Commission was created in response, and it established the Evansville-Vanderburgh Levee Authority District, which built a system of earth levees, concrete walls, and pumping stations to protect the city.

Jeffersonville welcomed the 1,000 WPA workers who came to rescue that city's residents. The federal government spent $500,000 in aid there, and $70,000 in New Albany. The Pennsylvania Railroad evacuated many area residents by train from its depot in Jeffersonville. Several small riverside towns, such as Mauckport and New Amsterdam, were so devastated that they never recovered.

Illinois
Harrisburg suffered flooding from the Ohio River in 1883–1884 and again in 1913. Much of the city, except "Crusoes' Island", a downtown orbit that encircled the town square, was underwater. High water had reached  from the river, and the city was flooded in its position among tributary lowlands of the Saline River. Many flooded mines were deemed condemned which left the local economy crippled. In 1938, the state of Illinois had completed one of the largest operations of its kind ever attempted in the United States, the removal of more than two and a half billion gallons of flood water from Sahara mine No. 3 near downtown Harrisburg. By the time the flood waters had receded, 4000 were left homeless. National guard boats were the means of transportation in the city, and several thousand people were transported daily from temporary island to island. According to the Sanborn Map Company, Harrisburg in October 1925 had a population of 15,000, and in a revised version by January 1937 the population had fallen to 13,000. Afterwards, the Army Corps of Engineers erected a levee north and east of the city to protect it from future floods. The levee has become the official northern and eastern border of the town.

Rural Pulaski County was functionally left an island by the rising portions of the Cache River, which near its mouth flowed in reverse as the Ohio floodwaters forced their way along the Cache to the Mississippi River above Cairo. The majority of county residents were driven from their homes, while the riverside county seat, Mound City, was entirely flooded, with the shallowest locations still lying under  of water. Cairo itself was saved only by low water levels on the Mississippi River, which rose only to the highest spots on the levees without surmounting them. The historic city of Shawneetown was completely inundated and the residents were forced to move to a tent city on the outskirts. Property damages in the southern Illinois region amounted to more than $75 million ($1.2 billion in 2015). Over three hundred bridges were smashed, six schools were ruined, and twelve hundred submerged homes. Damage in Shawneetown was so cataclysmic the town relocated three miles inland to higher ground.

Kentucky

In Louisville, the water reached a height of 40 feet, which resulted in almost 70 percent of the entire city being underwater. 175,000 people were forced to leave their homes and relocate due to the flood. The reported damage of the flood in the state resulted in about $250 million worth of damage. This flood outdoes the second highest water level in the city of Louisville by an astonishing 10 feet, showing how large the flood really was. Several businesses in the Louisville area were devastated, especially the famed Rose Island amusement park (on the Indiana side of the river near Charlestown), which never rebuilt. As a result of the flood, newer development in Louisville was directed to the east out of the flood plain. The east end has since benefited by a long-term concentration of wealth among residents and businesses which located away from the older central and western areas of the city.

At Paducah, in January 1937, there was a two week period of rain followed by a sleet storm. Initially, there were only a few individuals that were skeptical of the risen water level. At the time, most residents were accustomed to it and thought absolutely nothing of it. By January 19, it became clear that the water was reaching a very high level. For nearly three weeks, 27,000 residents were forced to flee to stay with friends and relatives in higher ground in McCracken County or in other counties. Some shelters were provided by the American Red Cross and local churches. Buildings in downtown Paducah bear historic plaques that note the high-water marks, and at least one historic marker indicates the farthest inland extent of flood waters in the city.

With  of rainfall in 16 days, along with sheets of swiftly moving ice, the '37 flood was the worst natural disaster in Paducah's history. Because Paducah's earthen levee was ineffective against this flood, the United States Army Corps of Engineers was commissioned to build the flood wall that now protects the city.

West Virginia 
Huntington, WV, a city in the tri-state area that was built as a link between steamboat and railway commerce, experienced some of the worst flooding, with a crest of 69.45 ft (19 feet above flood stage). First responders, volunteers, and the Army Corps of Engineers navigated the city via rowboats and helped citizens to reach the relief shelters set up in undamaged churches and schools. Like other communities in the Ohio River Valley, Huntington was regularly visited by damaging floods, and business owners and community members were typically self-reliant in the aftermath. After the unprecedented damage of the 1937 flood, however, community and business leaders decided that more substantive preventative measures were necessary. Immediately following the flood, the Chamber of Commerce pushed for the construction of a floodwall that would protect Huntington and the surrounding areas.

After a prolonged fight and a legal battle that made it to the West Virginia Supreme Court, the flood wall was approved, and the project was taken on by the United States Army Corps of Engineers. Since its completion in 1943, the Huntington floodwall it is estimated that it has prevented an estimated $238.8 million in flood damage.

Other areas of West Virginia were devastated by the flood as well. The Wheeling island had to be evacuated, as it was completely submerged when the flood crested at 47 feet. In Parkersburg, the river reached a crest of 55 feet.

References

Further reading
 
 
 Welky, David. The Thousand-Year Flood: The Ohio-Mississippi Disaster of 1937 (University of Chicago Press; 2011)  Read the introduction to the book.

External links

 "Pictures of Cincinnati during the 1937 flood", The Enquirer
 Images of the Public Library of Cincinnati wiki
 1937 Flood images from University of Louisville Libraries' Digital Collections
 A personal account of the 1937 flood, Woodspoint
 "Portsmouth, Ohio", The Ackerman Collection of Historic Photographs, Southern Ohio Museum
 1937 "Flood pictures of Posey County", Mt. Vernon, Indiana, Website
 Man Against the River YouTube video (9.55 min.). Describes the work of the Works Projects Administration in helping victims of 1937 flood of the Ohio River.
Survivors remember 1937 flood on 80th anniversary | News | herald-dispatch.com. Describes a first hand account of a survivor of the flood.

1937 floods in the United States
1937 natural disasters in the United States
1937 in Illinois
1937 in Indiana
1937 in Kentucky
1937 in Ohio
1937 in Pennsylvania
1937 in West Virginia
Floods in the United States
History of Cincinnati
History of Louisville, Kentucky
History of Pittsburgh
Natural disasters in Illinois
Natural disasters in Indiana
Natural disasters in Kentucky
Natural disasters in Ohio
Natural disasters in Pennsylvania
Natural disasters in West Virginia
Ohio River 
Ohio River floods 
Cairo, Illinois